Konstantin Priahin (born February 11, 1973) is a Kyrgyzstani former swimmer, who specialized in backstroke events. He represented Kyrgyzstan in two editions of the Olympic Games (1996 and 2000).

Priahin made his official debut at the 1996 Summer Olympics in Atlanta. He failed to reach the top 16 final in the 100 m backstroke, finishing forty-fifth in a time of 1:00.26. A member of the Kyrgyzstan team, he also placed twenty-first, along with Konstantin Andriushin, Yevgeny Petrashov, and Russian import Sergey Ashihmin, in the 4×100 m medley relay (3:56.24).

At the 2000 Summer Olympics in Sydney, Priahin competed only in the men's 100 m backstroke. He eclipsed a FINA B-cut of 58.05 from the Kazakhstan Open Championships in Almaty. He challenged seven other swimmers in heat two, including South Korea's 17-year-old Sung Min. He registered a lifetime best of 59.86 to overhaul a minute barrier and pick up a seventh seed, finishing behind leader Sung by 2.71 seconds. Priahin failed to advance into the semifinals, as he placed forty-ninth overall in the prelims.

References

External links
 

1973 births
Living people
Kyrgyzstani male backstroke swimmers
Olympic swimmers of Kyrgyzstan
Swimmers at the 1996 Summer Olympics
Swimmers at the 2000 Summer Olympics
Swimmers at the 1998 Asian Games
Asian Games competitors for Kyrgyzstan
Kyrgyzstani people of Russian descent